The Stony Brook Seawolves men's basketball statistical leaders are individual statistical leaders of the Stony Brook Seawolves men's basketball program in various categories, including points, assists, blocks, rebounds, and steals. Within those areas, the lists identify single-game, single-season, and career leaders. The Seawolves represent Stony Brook University in the NCAA Division I Colonial Athletic Association.

Stony Brook played its first Division I season in 1999. These lists are updated through the end of the 2021–22 season.

Scoring

Rebounds

Assists

Steals

Blocks

References

Lists of college basketball statistical leaders by team
Statistical